Salix gracilistyla  is a species of willow native to Japan, Korea and China known in English as the rose-gold pussy willow.

It is a deciduous shrub that reaches a height of 1–6 m.

Cultivars
'Melanostachys', also known as the black pussy willow, is known for its jet-black male and female catkin blooms which appear in early spring. Its male catkins also have red anthers, which slowly turn soft yellow from pollen. It has gained the Royal Horticultural Society’s Award of Garden Merit.

Gallery

References

External links

 
 Botanische Tuinen Utrecht - Plant van de maand: Archief: Maart  (has a picture of 'Melanostachys')
 Michigan State University Extension: Salix gracilistyla var. melanostachys—Black Pussy Willow
 MOBOT: Salix gracilistyla 'Melanostachys'

gracilistyla